The Hertha Zehlendorf is a German football club from the suburb of Zehlendorf in Berlin.

The club is one of the largest football clubs in the country and has a strong youth department which has won two national youth championships. The department has developed a number of international players for Germany and other countries.

History

1903–1945
The club was formed by 30 local football enthusiasts on 10 March 1903, under the name of Thor- und Fußballclub Germania 03 Zehlendorf. By 1909, it had however changed its name to FC Hertha Zehlendorf. In 1913, the club moved to a new ground, Siebenendenweg, now called Ernst-Reuter-Sportfeld, away from the Tempelhofer Feld, where it was never entirely happy. The team was for a time part of BFC Hertha 1892 but by September 1914 the club became independent again, under the name of FC Hertha 06 Zehlendorf.

After the end of the First World War, in January 1919, the club merged with local side VfB Zehlendorf 03 to form the current club, FC Hertha 03 Zehlendorf. It was from this union that the club took its foundation date.

For the next decade, the club did not particularly stand out within the ranks of Berlin football clubs. In 1933, it finally won a championship in the local Kreisklasse. However, they missed out on being promoted when German football league system was restructured with the introduction of the top-flight Gauliga.

The club struggled through this period and eventually had to form an on-the-field relationship with Union 24 Lichterfelde to survive. During the Second World War, play came almost completely to a halt.

1945–1963
After the war, all previously existing clubs and associations were outlawed in Berlin and the former Hertha existed under the name of SG Zehlendorf for a while. It entered the Amateurliga Berlin (II) in 1947, a league that was played in a number of regional groups. It however became the first club in Berlin to receive a license in 1948 to revert to its original name by the allied occupation authorities.

On the field, the club qualified for the single-division Amateurliga in 1950 and immediately became a strong side in this league, winning the championship in 1953. The club's youth side took out its first Berlin championship in 1950, a game played as a curtain raiser for a Germany versus Turkey friendly, in front of 60,000, on 17 June 1951. Germany lost 1–2, but Zehlendorf beat Hertha BSC 3–2.

The team entered the tier-one Oberliga Berlin for the 1953–54 season, were all the big names of West Berlin football were playing in those days. It found life at this level much harder and was immediately relegated again, finishing 11th out of 12 teams. Back in the Amateurliga, another championship was won and the club earned the right to return to the Oberliga.

In this league, the team would stay until 1963, earning lower table finishes each season but surviving nevertheless. Hertha in this time earned much more local success with its youth teams, a fact not much changed even today, winning Berlin championship in various age groups over the years.

1963–74: Regionalliga years
In 1963, West German football was fundamentally changed with the introduction of the Bundesliga. Below it, five regional leagues, the Regionalligas, were formed. Hertha did not apply for a spot in the new Bundesliga as only one club from Berlin was admitted and the bigger names in local football, Hertha BSC and Tasmania 1900 Berlin far out qualified the little club.

1974–present
Hertha missed out on the league championship there in its first season, coming second by a point to Spandauer SV, who won promotion to the second division. The next three seasons, the club spent in midfield but its youth teams once more impressed, reaching the final in both the under-19 and the under-17 German championships in 1978.

In 1978–79, it managed to win the league. This entitled the club to take part in the promotion round to the 2. Bundesliga. It had to play OSC Bremerhaven and beat the opposition 5–4 in Berlin. In Bremerhaven it held a 0–0 until four minutes from the end, seeing itself already in the second division but then OSC scored the winning goal and earned promotion on the away goal rule. Its Berlin title qualified the club for the German amateur football championship, too, where it went all the way to the final and lost to ESV Ingolstadt.

The club continued to be a driving force in what was now renamed Amateur Oberliga Berlin, finishing in the top five all but once in the next twelve seasons. In 1981–82, another highlight followed, coming second in the league to Tennis Borussia Berlin, on equal points but falling nine goals short. The team returned to the German amateur championship, where the FSV Mainz 05 proofed to strong in the semi-finals, winning both games. Thirdly, the club also qualified for the DFB-Pokal on the strength of a Berliner Landespokal win. It drew Hertha BSC for the first round and, in front of 12,000 spectators, the score was two all after regular time but then the big Hertha scored two more goals and knocked the little Hertha out of the cup. Little Hertha (German: Kleine Hertha) is the long-standing nickname of the club, referring to the fact that Hertha BSC was always the bigger and more successful of the two Herthas.

The season after, the club came second in the league once more, this time to SC Charlottenburg, and earned another shot at the amateur championship but this time, the FC Bayern Munich II in the first round was as far as it went.

In 1988, the club's under-17's finally took out the West German championship, beating southern powerhouse VfB Stuttgart 2–1 in the final with later German international Christian Ziege in Zehlendorf's line-up. The year after, wealthy FC Bayern Munich managed to beat the amateur club's youth team on penalties only in the final.

From 1988 to 1990, the Oberliga Berlin became the scene of Hertha's struggle with Reinickendorfer Füchse for the league championship but both times Reinickendorf won the upper hand. Each time, Hertha only earned the right to compete for the amateur championship again and each time it lost in the first round.

1990–91 was the Oberliga Berlin's last season, the German reunion also affected football and the NOFV-Oberliga was established instead. Hertha became part of the NOFV-Oberliga Mitte, a league dominated by 1. FC Union Berlin in its short three-year existence and Zehlendorf managed only average performances. Nevertheless, it did qualify for the new tier-three Regionalliga Nordost in 1994. In a league full of former East German football powerhouses, the team struggled for four seasons before being relegated in 1998.

The club managed to only survive two seasons in the NOFV-Oberliga Nord (IV) before another relegation, now to the tier-five Verbandsliga Berlin. It played in this league, renamed the Berlin-Liga in 2008, until 2014 when a championship took the club back to the NOFV-Oberliga Nord.

Honours
The club's honours:

League
German amateur football championship
 Runners-up: 1979
Regionalliga Berlin (II): 2
 Winners: 1969, 1970
 Amateurliga Berlin (II): 1
Winners: 1953
Oberliga Berlin (III): 1
 Winners: 1979
 Runners-up: 1975, 1982, 1983, 1989, 1990
 Berlin-Liga (VI): 1
 Champions: 2014

Cup
 Berlin Cup: 3
 Winners: 1977, 1982, 1989
 Runners-up: 1968, 1969, 1974, 1975, 1990, 1996

Youth
German Under 19 Championship: 1
 Winners: 1970
 Runners-up: 1978
 German Under 17 Championship: 1
 Winners: 1988
 Runners-up: 1978, 1989

Past managers

Recent seasons
The recent season-by-season performance of the club:

 With the introduction of the Regionalligas in 1994 and the 3. Liga in 2008 as the new third tier, below the 2. Bundesliga, all leagues below dropped one tier. In 2008 the Verbandsliga Berlin was renamed Berlin-Liga.

Former Hertha 03 players
The following players developed through the club's youth system to become professionals:

 Male
 Michael Krampitz
 Michael Kellner
 Volkmar Gross
 Uwe Kliemann
 Klaus-Peter Hanisch
 Wolfgang Sühnholz
 Norbert Stolzenburg
 Christian Sackewitz
 Pierre Littbarski
 Martino Gatti
 Karsten Bäron

 Christian Ziege
 Marcus Feinbier
 Carsten Ramelow
 Niko Kovač
 Robert Kovač
 Thorben Marx
 Benjamin Siegert
 Malik Fathi
 Sofian Chahed
 Sejad Salihović
 Sebastian Stachnik
 Cem Efe

 Female
 Ariane Hingst
 Inken Becher

DFB-Pokal appearances
The club has qualified for the first round of the DFB-Pokal six times:

Sources
 Das deutsche Fußball-Archiv historical German domestic league tables 
 Deutsche Liga-Chronik seit 1945 – Kapitel F: Berlin/Nordost  Historical German football tables since 1945, publisher: DSFS, published: 2006, pages: F3 – F82
 List of all German under-19 champions 1969–2008 DFB website
 List of all German under-17 champions 1977–2008 DFB website

References

External links 
 
 Abseits Guide to German Soccer – Hertha Zehlendorf
 Hertha Zehlendorf at Weltfussball.de

Football clubs in Germany
Hertha Zehlendorf
Steglitz-Zehlendorf
Association football clubs established in 1903
1903 establishments in Germany